Three of a Perfect Pair is the tenth studio album by English band King Crimson, released in March 1984 by record label E.G. It is the final studio album to feature the quartet of Robert Fripp, Adrian Belew, Tony Levin and Bill Bruford.

Content 

According to Fripp: "The album presents two distinct sides of the band’s personality, which has caused at least as much confusion for the group as it has the public and the industry. The left side is accessible, the right side excessive."

The "other side" on the 2001 CD remaster consists of instrumental material from the 1983 sessions, and a 1989 a cappella recording (first published in the 1991 "Frame By Frame" box set) in which Tony Levin performed his humorous song "The King Crimson Barber Shop".

The title of the album is based on the idea of “perfect opposites”, or someone's truth, someone else's truth, and an objective truth (the idea of “three sides to every story”).

The Peter Willis designed artwork illustrates the sacred–profane dichotomy while being a simplified version of the Larks' Tongues in Aspic cover; a rising phallic object represents a male solar deity about to penetrate the crescent figure, a female lunar deity. According to Fripp, the artwork is “a presentation of a reconciliation of Western & Eastern Christianity..the front cover has the two elements, representing the male & female principles. The back cover has the third element drawing together & reconciling the preceding opposite terms”.

Tracks 10-15 were added for the 2001 30th Anniversary remaster. The aforementioned instrumentals, “The King Crimson Barbershop”, and three alternate mixes of "Sleepless". Two of the three were previously released on the UK 12" single. The Bob Clearmountain mix appeared (incorrectly credited and against the band's wishes) on the U.S. Warner Bros. pressing of the LP.

The hip hop duo Gang Starr would later sample the intro to "Dig Me" in their song "Words I Manifest (Remix)" from their 1989 debut album No More Mr. Nice Guy.

Release and reception 

Released on 27 March 1984, Three of a Perfect Pair reached number 30 in the UK Albums Chart.

Trouser Press described it as "a most disjunct album from a band that prided itself on carefully matched contradictions. The Left Side sports four of Adrian Belew's poorer songs and a self-derivative instrumental; the flip is nearly all-instrumental, nearly free-form, nearly brilliant. [...] Apparently the Frippressive 'discipline' that forged the critically acclaimed pop/art synthesis of the first two latter-day Crimson albums is not a permanent condition."

During an interview on BBC Radio 1 in 1984, Robert Fripp described the album's 'left' side as "accessible" and 'right' side as "excessive".

A new 5.1 surround sound mix by Steven Wilson and Robert Fripp was released in October 2016 for the 40th Anniversary Series as a standalone CD/DVD package and as part of the  On (and off) The Road (1981 - 1984) boxed set.

Track listing

Personnel
King Crimson
Adrian Belew – fretted and fretless guitars, lead vocals
Robert Fripp – guitar, frippertronics
Tony Levin – bass guitar, chapman stick, synthesizer, backing vocals
Bill Bruford – acoustic and electric drums

Additional personnel
Brad Davis – engineer
Tony Arnold (Arny's Shack) – co-engineer on "Industry" and "Dig Me"
Nick James, Ray Niznik, Peter Hefter – assistant engineers
Tex Read – social services
Peter Willis (Trevall Mill Studio) – cover symbol design basis
Timothy Eames – cover art

Chart performance

References

External links
 

King Crimson albums
1984 albums
E.G. Records albums
Warner Records albums
Virgin Records albums
New wave albums by English artists